Banca dello Stato del Cantone Ticino is a Swiss cantonal bank which is part of the 24 cantonal banks serving Switzerland's 26 cantons.  Founded in 1915, Banca dello Stato del Cantone Ticino had 21 branches across Ticino in 2014 with 448 employees; total assets of the bank were 10 854.15 mln CHF. Banca dello Stato del Cantone Ticino has full state guarantee of its liabilities.

In 2013, 75% of its income came from lending interests, leading the bank to consider acquiring a private banking unit to diversify its assets.

Notes and references

See also 
 Cantonal bank
 List of banks in Switzerland

External links 
 

Ticino
Economy of Ticino
Companies based in Bellinzona